United Nations Security Council Resolution 1715, adopted by acclamation at a closed meeting on October 9, 2006, having considered the question of the recommendation for the appointment of the eighth Secretary-General of the United Nations, the Council recommended to the General Assembly that Mr. Ban Ki-moon of South Korea be appointed for a term of office from January 1, 2007, to December 31, 2011.

Four days later, the General Assembly also voted symbolically to approve the decision of the Security Council.

See also
 List of United Nations Security Council Resolutions 1701 to 1800 (2006–2008)
 Resolutions 1091 (1996), 1358 (2001)
 United Nations Secretary-General selection, 2006

References

External links
 
Text of the Resolution at undocs.org

 1715
 1715
October 2006 events